Adventures of Nils Holgersson (Swedish: Nils Holgerssons underbara resa) is a 1962 Swedish film directed by Kenne Fant. It is based on the novel The Wonderful Adventures of Nils by Selma Lagerlöf. It was entered into the 3rd Moscow International Film Festival.

Cast
Sven Lundberg as Nils Holgersson
Max von Sydow as The Father
Annika Tretow as The Mother
Jarl Kulle as Mårten Gåskarl (voice)
Naima Wifstrand as Mother Akka (voice)
Georg Funkquist as Gorgo (voice)
Olof Sandborg as Bataki (voice)
Toivo Pawlo as Smirre Fox (voice)
Christina Schollin as Office Girl
Gustav VI Adolf as himself

References

External links
 
 

1962 films
Films based on works by Selma Lagerlöf
1960s Swedish-language films
Swedish children's films
Films directed by Kenne Fant
1960s Swedish films